F.C. Porto de Macau was a football club based in Macau. They played in the Macau's first division, the Campeonato da 1ª Divisão do Futebol. The team was the branch of F.C. Porto. It disappears from the first division beginning at the 2013 season but comes back beginning at the 2019, to the Junior Divisão—the fourth level of Football in Macau.

Current squad
Season 2015

References

Football clubs in Macau
2006 establishments in Macau